Calgary Northeast was a federal electoral district in Alberta, Canada, that was represented in the House of Commons of Canada from 1988 to 2015. It is an urban riding in the city of Calgary.

History
This riding was created in 1987 from Calgary East and Bow River ridings.

In 2003, parts of this electoral district were transferred to Calgary Centre-North riding. 

The riding was abolished in 2015. The bulk of the riding became Calgary Skyview, except for a small portion that was transferred to Calgary Forest Lawn (the former Calgary East).

Members of Parliament

This riding has elected the following members of the House of Commons of Canada:

Election results

Note: Conservative vote is compared to the total of Progressive Conservative and Canadian Alliance vote in 2000.

Note: Canadian Alliance vote is compared to the Reform vote in 1997.

See also
 Calgary North East provincial electoral district
 List of Canadian federal electoral districts

References

Notes

External links
 Calgary NorthEast Conservative Party District Association
 
 Expenditures -2008
 Expenditures - 2004
 Expenditures - 2000
 Expenditures - 1997
 Elections Canada
 Website of the Parliament of Canada

Former federal electoral districts of Alberta
Politics of Calgary